TR7 or some variant thereof may represent:

 Tomáš Rosický, a Czech footballer.
 Triumph TR7
 TR-7, see Travan
 TR7, a postal district in the TR postcode area